This is a list of episodes for the anime series Cromartie High School.

Episode list

References

External links
Official Cromartie Site
TV Tokyo Cromartie Site 

Cromartie High School